Robert Kranjec (born 16 July 1981) is a Slovenian former ski jumper.

Career 
Kranjec won a bronze medal at the 2002 Winter Olympics in Salt Lake City in the team large hill event. He won his first World Cup event at Kuusamo, Finland in 2005. In the following years he could not reach any top results except for ski flying competitions. In 2010 he celebrated his second World Cup victory at Tauplitz, Austria. After two more successful ski flying competitions at Tauplitz and Oberstdorf, in which he achieved the second place each time, he won the ski flying World Cup in the 2009–10 season.

In 2012, he won the 2012 FIS Ski Flying World Championships and thus became the Slovenia's third World Champion in ski jumping and the first in ski flying. He also set a new national record. At the same championship, he won the bronze medal in team competition. In the same season, Kranjec also won his second ski flying World Cup title.

Kranjec retired from ski jumping in March 2019.

Personal life 
Kranjec was born in Ljubljana, Yugoslavia (present-day Slovenia) to Slovene mother and Croat father.

World Cup

Standings

Individual wins

References

External links 

 
 

1981 births
Living people
Skiers from Ljubljana
Olympic ski jumpers of Slovenia
Olympic bronze medalists for Slovenia
Slovenian male ski jumpers
Ski jumpers at the 2002 Winter Olympics
Ski jumpers at the 2006 Winter Olympics
Ski jumpers at the 2010 Winter Olympics
Ski jumpers at the 2014 Winter Olympics
Olympic medalists in ski jumping
FIS Nordic World Ski Championships medalists in ski jumping
Medalists at the 2002 Winter Olympics
Slovenian people of Croatian descent